Wesley Lee McDonald (July 6, 1924February 8, 2009) was a United States Navy admiral and naval aviator. He led the first air strike against North Vietnam after the Gulf of Tonkin incident and was the commander in charge of Operation Urgent Fury, the invasion of Grenada to rescue American citizens.

Early life and education
McDonald was born in Washington, D.C., on July 6, 1924. He graduated from the United States Naval Academy in 1946 and married his high school sweetheart. He began his career as a naval aviator in 1950, serving in several carrier fighter and attack squadrons. In 1964, McDonald was the skipper of Attack Squadron VA-56 flying A-4 Skyhawks aboard the USS Ticonderoga. On August 5, 1964, he served as a flight leader for Operation Pierce Arrow, the first retaliatory strike against North Vietnam following the Gulf of Tonkin incident. McDonald led his Skyhawk strike force against oil tanks at Vinh, destroying 90% of the facility.

Career

Senior leader
McDonald's career led him to the highest levels of the United States Navy's command structure. He attended the National Defense University's National War College, graduating with the class of 1969. From 1970 to 1971, he commanded the USS Coral Sea. In 1972, as a rear admiral, McDonald was assigned as the carrier group commander. He later served as deputy chief of Naval Personnel in Washington, D.C., in 1975. In the fall of 1977, as COM2ndFLT, The U.S.S. Harry E. Yarnell (CG-17) served as his flagship during NATO exercises in the North Atlantic. In 1978, as Commander, U.S. Second Fleet, he embarked on the USS Arthur W. Radford on the way to NATO exercises in the North Atlantic. In 1982, McDonald was appointed Supreme Allied Commander Atlantic (SACLANT), one of two supreme commanders of the North Atlantic Treaty Organization. At the same time, he assumed command of the U.S. Atlantic Command (CINCLANT) and U.S. Atlantic Fleet (CINCLANTFLT). In 1983, McDonald, in his role as CINCLANT, was placed in overall command of Operation Urgent Fury—the invasion of Grenada to rescue U.S. nationals. He later summed up the success of the operation in an address before the House Armed Services Committee.

McDonald was the last United States Navy admiral to command all three organizations (Allied Atlantic Command, U.S. Atlantic Command, and U.S. Atlantic Fleet) at the same time. He relinquished command of the U.S. Atlantic Fleet to Admiral Carlisle A.H. Trost, USN, on October 4, 1985, and command of the U.S. Atlantic Command and Allied Atlantic Command to Admiral Lee Baggett Jr. in November 1985.

Later life and death
After his retirement from the Navy in 1985, McDonald played an active role in the aviation community in his leadership positions with the National Aeronautic Association (NAA) and the National Aviation Club (NAC). He helped orchestrate a merger of interests between NAA and NAC bringing benefits to both organizations. McDonald has also served on the boards of the U.S. Navy Memorial Foundation, the U.S. Naval Aviation Museum and the Armed Services YMCA. McDonald also often guest lectured an honors senior seminar led by Ford Foundation Fellow Professor Karl von Vorys at the University of Pennsylvania, and often took groups of students on personal tours of the Pentagon. His first wife, Norma, died in 1989. McDonald later remarried and lived in Arlington, Virginia, with his wife, Helen until he died February 8, 2009, in Arlington, Virginia. He has one son and three daughters, and is buried at Arlington National Cemetery, in Arlington, Virginia.

Awards and decorations

Honors and recognition

McDonald's awards include the Defense Distinguished Service Medal, the Navy Distinguished Service Medal, the Legion of Merit, the Distinguished Flying Cross, the Air Medal, and awards from several European and South American nations.
In 1990, McDonald was elected Grand Paramount Carabao, leader of the  Military Order of the Carabao. In 2004, McDonald was presented with the National Aeronautic Association's Cliff Henderson award for his 56 years of support to American aviation. In 2007, the National Aeronautic Association renamed its Elder Statesman of Aviation Award in honor of McDonald, who was a past chairman of the organization. McDonald was a Senior Fellow of the National Defense University.

A number of awards are named in honor of McDonald, including:
 The Admiral Wesley L. McDonald Leadership Award, jointly sponsored by Strike Fighter Wing Pacific, the San Joaquin Valley Squadron of the Association of Naval Aviation (ANA) and the Greater Kings County Navy League.
 The Wesley L. McDonald Elder Statesman of Aviation Award, sponsored by the National Aeronautic Association.

Notes

References

External links

 
 
 
 

1924 births
2009 deaths
United States Naval Academy alumni
United States Naval Aviators
United States Navy personnel of the Korean War
United States Navy personnel of the Vietnam War
Recipients of the Air Medal
Recipients of the Distinguished Flying Cross (United States)
Recipients of the Meritorious Service Medal (United States)
United States Navy admirals
Recipients of the Legion of Merit
Recipients of the Navy Distinguished Service Medal
Recipients of the Defense Distinguished Service Medal
Burials at Arlington National Cemetery